The women's shot put event  at the 2001 IAAF World Indoor Championships was held on March 10.

Results

References
Results

Shot
Shot put at the World Athletics Indoor Championships
2001 in women's athletics